Yahata Choseichi Dam is a rockfill dam located in Aichi Prefecture in Japan. The dam is used for irrigation. The catchment area of the dam is 0.7 km2. The dam impounds about 2  ha of land when full and can store 66 thousand cubic meters of water. The construction of the dam was started on 1969 and completed in 1986.

References

Dams in Aichi Prefecture
1986 establishments in Japan